Strange Fate (French: Étrange destin) is a 1946 French drama film directed by Louis Cuny and starring Renée Saint-Cyr, Aimé Clariond and Henri Vidal.

The film's sets were designed by the art director Aimé Bazin.

Cast
 Renée Saint-Cyr as Patricia  
 Aimé Clariond as Le professeur Gallois 
 Henri Vidal as Alain de Saulieu  
 Nathalie Nattier as Germaine  
 Denise Grey as Mme d'Evremond  
 Robert Favart as L'assistant du professeur Gallois  
 Gabrielle Fontan as Mme Durtain 
 Hélène Bellanger 
 Charlotte Ecard 
 Luce Fabiole 
 Gaston Girard 
 Georges Gosset 
 Marie-Thérèse Moissel 
 Julienne Paroli 
 Marcelle Rexiane
 Roger Rudel 
 Jean-Charles Thibault

References

Bibliography 
 Cook, Samantha. Writers and production artists. St James Pr, 1993.

External links 
 

1946 films
1946 drama films
French drama films
1940s French-language films
French black-and-white films
1940s French films